Heolgerrig Halt railway station served the village of Heolgerrig, in the historical county of Glamorgan, Wales, from 1937 to 1961 on the Brecon and Merthyr Tydfil Junction Railway.

History 
The station was opened on 31 May 1937 by the Great Western Railway, although the company notice stated that it opened on 26 May 1937. It closed on 13 November 1961.

References

External links 

Former Great Western Railway stations
Former London, Midland and Scottish Railway stations
Railway stations in Great Britain opened in 1937
Railway stations in Great Britain closed in 1961
1937 establishments in Wales
1961 disestablishments in Wales